Archain is a human protein that is encoded by gene which is located on chromosome 11.
Also known as ARCN1, it plays a role in eukaryotic cell biology.

It is part of the COPI coatomer complex.

References

External links
 

Peripheral membrane proteins
Genes on human chromosome 11